The 1963–64 Bulgarian Cup was the 24th season of the Bulgarian Cup (in this period the tournament was named Cup of the Soviet Army). Slavia Sofia won the competition, beating Botev Plovdiv 3–2 in the final at the Vasil Levski National Stadium.

First round

|}

Second round

|}

Quarter-finals

|}

Semi-finals

|}

Final

Details

References

1963-64
1963–64 domestic association football cups
Cup